Idolatteria maon is a species of moth of the family Tortricidae first described by Herbert Druce in 1901. It is found in Ecuador.

References

Moths described in 1901
Archipini